Philippine Science High School – Cagayan Valley Campus (PSHS–CVC) is a campus of the Philippine Science High School System, a specialized public high school that admits and provides scholarships to high school students primarily from the Cagayan Valley region. It is located in Barangay Masoc, Bayombong, Nueva Vizcaya. Prior to its inclusion into the PSHSS, the school was named the Nueva Vizcaya Science High School, and was located at the Nueva Vizcaya State University compound. It first opened in 1996, 4 years after the law that created the school had passed in Congress.

History

Nueva Vizcaya Science High School 
PSHS–CVC was established as the Nueva Vizcaya Science High School (NVSHS) from Republic Act 7622, passed by then-Congressman Carlos Padilla. Its curriculum was described by the Department of Education, Culture and Sports. It used to be situated in the same compound as the Nueva Vizcaya State University. In 1997, the control of the NVSHS was transferred to the Department of Science and Technology under Republic Act 8364.

Present 
In 1998, Republic Act 8496, otherwise known as the "Philippine Science High School (PSHS) System Act of 1997", was approved by then-President Fidel Ramos. This act established a system that merged the four existing PSHS campuses under one system. In 2001, the law was amended to include the NVSHS, thus incorporating the school into the system. Under this law, the school was renamed into the Philippine Science High School – Cagayan Valley Campus.

In 2002, under Governor Rodolfo Q. Agbayani, construction of a new compound for the PSHS–CVC started Barangay Masoc in Bayombong, Nueva Vizcaya. In 2010, the PSHS–CVC had completed its relocation onto the new site.

Under the country's transition to a K–12 education system in 2013, the system also began to cater to students of Grade 11 and 12. The first batch of students under the new K-12 system graduated in 2018.

References

External links

Philippine Science High School System
Schools in Nueva Vizcaya